Bangladesh Canada Hindu Cultural Society (BCHCS) & Bangladesh Canada Hindu Mandir (BCHM) is one of the largest Hindu temples in Toronto, Ontario, Canada.

BCHCS was formed in 1995 with a goal to provide a common platform for local Bangladeshi Hindu community members to practice spiritual and cultural activities. since then, BCHCS provides social support to the community and integrating the socio-cultural values of Hinduism in diversified Canadian societies. In 2005, BCHM was formed as an associate organization of BCHCS to accommodate the need of a Temple where local Hindus can practice their rich religious activities and festivals. BCHM got the status of registered charitable organization from Canada Revenue Agency (CRA) on 25 January 2005.

The organizations became owner of the property at 16 Dohme Avenue in Toronto on 28 March 2011 and the Temple moved to this permanent location on 31 July 2011.

Deities worshiped at the Temple
Lord Shiva
Sri Ganesh
Sri Kali Mata
Lord Shiva and Parvati
Sri Lakshmi Narayan
Sri Krishna and Radha
Devi Saraswati
Baba Lokenath Brahmachari

Major festivals celebrated
Durga Puja
Bengali New Year
Shyama Puja
Diwali
Janmaashtami
Laxmi Puja
Maha Shivratri
Holi
Ratha Yatra

See also

 World Hinduism
 Hinduism by country
 Hindu calendar
 List of Hindu temples
 Hindu deities
 List of Hindu deities
 List of Hinduism-related articles
 History of India
 Hindu scriptures

References

External links
 

Hindu temples in Canada
Hindu organizations based in Canada